Henningsia is a fungal genus in the family Meripilaceae. The genus was circumscribed in 1895 by Alfred Möller with Henningsia geminella as the type; this species is now known as H. brasiliensis. The generic name honours German mycologist Paul Christoph Hennings.

References

Polyporales genera
Meripilaceae
Taxa described in 1895